Tímea Babos was the defending champion, but lost in the quarterfinals to Monica Niculescu.

Anastasia Pavlyuchenkova won the title, defeating Angelique Kerber in the final 4–6, 6–2, 6–4.

Seeds

Draw

Finals

Top half

Bottom half

Qualifying

Seeds

Qualifiers

Draw

First qualifier

Second qualifier

Third qualifier

Fourth qualifier

References
Main Draw
Qualifying Draw

Monterrey Open - Singles
2013 Singles